The Ministry of Emergency Situations (abbreviated MCHS) is the government agency overseeing emergency services in Uzbekistan. It is responsible for aiding the people of Uzbekistan and protecting them during natural disasters, overseeing emergency measures, and coordination of other ministries and departments in such events.

Functions 
The functions of the MCHS was laid out in a presidential decree dating back to March 4, 1996, which defines the following tasks of the ministry:

 The implementation of state policy in the sphere of emergency situations
 Management of the Civil Defense of the Republic of Uzbekistan
 Coordination of ministries/agencies across the country that specialize in the prevention and elimination of the fallout caused by accidents and natural disasters
 Targeted and scientifically targeted activities aimed at eliminating emergency situations, protecting the population and the territory of the country and enhancing the sustainability of publicly funded activities, as well as training the public, officials, and government agencies to prevent and respond to emergencies, organization and implementation of technical software development

History 
The Republican Center for the Training of Heads of Civil Defense and Emergency Situations was established in 1992 as an independent agency of the Government of Uzbekistan. It operated until 1996 when a decision made by Uzbek President Islam Karimov on August 16, 1995, on the establishment of a Ministry of Emergency Situations came into effect. Immediately after its founding, it began the work of coordinating the establishment of public emergency reserve funds for financial, medical, material and technical resources to overcome the consequences of events that might be considered national emergencies. In 2019, the Main Directorate of Fire Safety of the Ministry of Internal Affairs and the Service for Controlling the Impact on Hydrometeorological Processes of the Ministry of Defense were transferred to the MCHS.

Subordinate Agencies 
 Central Office
 Territorial Offices
 Structural Units
 Schools
 Fire Safety Academy
 Scientific Research Institute of Fire Safety and Emergency Situations
 Center for Initial Training and Advanced Training of Firefighters and Rescuers
 Specialized Lyceum for Preparing Youth

Scientific and Technical Council

 Civil Defense 
 State Emergency Management and Anti-Money Laundering System (FIEZ)
National Center for Management and Response to Emergency Situations

Ministers 
 1996–1997 - Ismail Jurabekov
 1997–2000 - Rustam Akhmedov
 2000–2002 - Vyacheslav Qosimov
 2002–2003 - Botir Parpiyev
 2003–2006 - Bakhtiyar Subanov
 2006–2008 - Qobul Berdiyev
 2008–2010 - Qosimali Ahmedov
 2010–2017 - Tursinhan Xudayberganov
 2017–2018 - Rustam Jo'rayev
 Since 2018 - Tursinhan Xudayberganov

References

Military of Uzbekistan
Emergency Situations
Government of Uzbekistan
Ministries established in 1996
1996 establishments in Uzbekistan